James Joseph "Babe" Donnelly (December 22, 1894 – July 27, 1968) was a Canadian professional ice hockey player who played 34 games in the National Hockey League for the Montreal Maroons during the 1926–27 season. The rest of his career, which lasted from 1916 to 1935, was spent in various minor leagues. He was born in Sault Ste. Marie, Ontario, and died there in 1968.

Career statistics

Regular season and playoffs

References

External links 
 

1894 births
1968 deaths
Buffalo Majors players
Canadian ice hockey defencemen
Detroit Greyhounds players
Ice hockey people from Ontario
London Panthers players
Montreal Maroons players
Minneapolis Millers (AHA) players
Ontario Hockey Association Senior A League (1890–1979) players
Philadelphia Arrows players
Sportspeople from Sault Ste. Marie, Ontario
Stratford Nationals players
Toronto Millionaires players
Tulsa Oilers (AHA) players